Arnald de Grey (11 September 1856 – 15 November 1889) was an English first-class cricketer who played for the amateur side I Zingari in 1880.

Life and career
Arnald de Gray was the second son of Thomas de Grey, 5th Baron Walsingham and his second wife, Emily Elizabeth Julia (née Thellusson).

His son, Nigel de Grey, was one of the codebreakers that worked on decrypting messages from the Enigma cipher machine.

References

1856 births
1889 deaths
English cricketers
I Zingari cricketers
People from Westminster